Lazarev Bay is a rectangular bay,  long and  wide, which separates Alexander Island from Rothschild Island and is bounded on the south side by the Wilkins Ice Shelf, which joins the east portion of Rothschild Island and the west portion of Alexander Island (partially Cape Vostok, the Havre Mountains and the Lassus Mountains). Two minor islands, Dint Island and Umber Island, lie merged within the ice of the Wilkins Ice Shelf within Lazarev Bay.

The north coast of Alexander Island was first seen from a great distance by the Russian expedition of 1821 under Fabian Gottlieb von Bellingshausen. The bay was first mapped from air photos taken by the Ronne Antarctic Research Expedition, 1947–48, by D. Searle of the Falkland Islands Dependencies Survey in 1960, and it was named by the UK Antarctic Place-Names Committee for Lieutenant Mikhail Petrovich Lazarev, second-in-command of Bellingshausen's expedition and commander of the sloop Mirnyy.

See also 
 Couperin Bay
 Schokalsky Bay

Further reading 
 Convey, Peter, Hopkins, David W., Roberts, Stephen J., Tyler, Andrew N., Global southern limit of flowering plants and moss peat accumulation, Polar Research / 30, https://doi.org/10.3402/polar.v30i0.8929
 Defense Mapping Agency  1992, Sailing Directions (planning Guide) and (enroute) for Antarctica, P 379

External links 

 Lazarev Bay on USGS website
 Lazarev Bay on SCAR website
 Lazarev Bay on marineregions.org
 Lazarev Bay on mindat.org
 Lazarev Bay area map

References 

Bays of Antarctica
Bodies of water of Alexander Island